Nathan Jones (born 20 January 1988) is a former Australian rules footballer known for playing for the Melbourne Football Club in the Australian Football League. He is the older brother of  player Zak Jones. He served as the captain of Melbourne from 2014 until he stepped down at the end of the 2019 season.

Early life
Jones played for the Dandenong Stingrays in the TAC Cup during his junior career and was selected to play for Vic Metro in the 2005 AFL Under-18 Championships. He was named in the 2005 Under-18 All-Australian team as a follower. He played in the TAC Cup Grand Final (now known as NAB League Boys) for Dandenong in 2005 and collected 36 disposals; however, they were defeated by 15 points by Gippsland Power.

Growing up, he was a  supporter.

AFL career

After Melbourne were eliminated from the finals, he played for Melbourne's VFL-affiliate team, Sandringham, and played in their premiership side.

He finished third in the award behind Joel Selwood and Scott Pendlebury and received 17 votes out of a possible 45. He was the runner-up in Melbourne's best and fairest with 190 votes, finishing behind James McDonald who received 260 votes.

Jones cemented himself in Melbourne's side by playing 21 games in 2008 in what was a disappointing year for the club, finishing on the bottom of the ladder. He played 21 matches in 2009 in a year where the club received the wooden spoon for the second consecutive season. After the Round 2 match against  in 2009, Jones's father was attacked by Collingwood fans in an altercation outside the ground. Jones remained a consistent figure in the side, playing every match in 2010 and 2011, including his 100th AFL game in the latter season.

Jones established himself as Melbourne's leading midfielder in 2012 by winning his first Keith 'Bluey' Truscott Medal as the club's best and fairest; in addition, he polled 14 votes in the Brownlow Medal count to finish inside the top 20. He was named as vice captain prior to the 2013 season.

In May 2013, Jones was appointed as interim co-captain alongside Jack Trengove, replacing the injured Jack Grimes. He played every match during the season and won the best and fairest for the second consecutive season, finishing ahead of Colin Garland.

After the appointment of new coach Paul Roos, Jones was elected as co-captain alongside Jack Grimes for the 2014 season. He played every match for the season, amassing a career-high 610 disposals, the second-highest tally in the league during the home-and-away season, as well as having the fourth-highest number of clearances. He won his third consecutive Keith 'Bluey' Truscott Medal, a feat only previously achieved by club champion Jim Stynes.

At the end of 2014, Jones signed a four-year contract extension with the Demons, practically ensuring he would remain a one-club player. In February 2015, after Jack Grimes relinquished the co-captaincy, Jones was announced as sole captain, with Lynden Dunn named as vice-captain. He played his 200th AFL game in the Round 22 match against ; however, he suffered an ankle injury in the second quarter that forced him to be substituted out of the game. He finished fifth in the best-and-fairest count; and, despite playing every match for the season, it was announced that he had played most of the season with a neck injury.

In 2021, the 33-year-old Jones sustained multiple injuries (including a hamstring and later calf injury) that saw him missing the majority of his season (as in 2020, where he'd injured his quadriceps). Nonetheless, Jones became just the second Melbourne player, after David Neitz, to reach the 300-game milestone for the club, doing so against  in round six. After Melbourne qualified for the 2021 AFL Grand Final, the injured Jones made the decision to return home to Victoria to be with his wife for the birth of their twins. He subsequently announced his retirement from the AFL, finishing on 302 games, four short of the club's all-time games record held by Neitz.

Statistics
 

|- style="background-color: #EAEAEA"
! scope="row" style="text-align:center" | 2006
|
| 2 || 8 || 2 || 0 || 64 || 47 || 111 || 20 || 25 || 0.3 || 0.0 || 8.0 || 5.9 || 13.9 || 2.5 || 3.1 || 2
|-
! scope="row" style="text-align:center" | 2007
|
| 2 || 21 || 10 || 6 || 219 || 146 || 365 || 61 || 86 || 0.5 || 0.6 || 10.4 || 6.9 || 16.9 || 2.9 || 3.9 || 5
|- style="background:#eaeaea;"
! scope="row" style="text-align:center" | 2008
|
| 2 || 21 || 9 || 6 || 212 || 220 || 432 || 65 || 53 || 0.4 || 0.3 || 10.1 || 10.5 || 20.6 || 3.1 || 2.5 || 0
|-
! scope="row" style="text-align:center" | 2009
|
| 2 || 20 || 8 || 11 || 209 || 234 || 443 || 77 || 41 || 0.4 || 0.6 || 10.5 || 11.7 || 22.2 || 3.9 || 2.1 || 4
|- style="background:#eaeaea;"
! scope="row" style="text-align:center" | 2010
|
| 2 || 22 || 9 || 12 || 198 || 227 || 425 || 54 || 62 || 0.4 || 0.5 || 9.0 || 10.3 || 19.3 || 2.5 || 2.8 || 1
|-
! scope="row" style="text-align:center" | 2011
|
| 2 || 22 || 14 || 9 || 266 || 241 || 507 || 100 || 68 || 0.6 || 0.4 || 12.1 || 11.0 || 23.1 || 4.5 || 3.1 || 1
|- style="background:#eaeaea;"
! scope="row" style="text-align:center" | 2012
|
| 2 || 21 || 16 || 10 || 265 || 251 || 516 || 45 || 95 || 0.8 || 0.5 || 12.6 || 12.0 || 24.6 || 2.1 || 4.5 || 14
|-
! scope="row" style="text-align:center" | 2013
|
| 2 || 22 || 8 || 7 || 233 || 276 || 509 || 46 || 76 || 0.4 || 0.3 || 10.6 || 12.5 || 23.1 || 2.0 || 3.4 || 6
|-style="background:#eaeaea;"
! scope="row" style="text-align:center" | 2014
|
| 2 || 22 || 7 || 6 || 311 || 299 || 610 || 64 || 115 || 0.3 || 0.3 || 14.1 || 13.6 || 27.7 || 2.9 || 5.2 || 13
|-
! scope="row" style="text-align:center" | 2015
|
| 2 || 22 || 12 || 7 || 268 || 255 || 523 || 53 || 95 || 0.5 || 0.3 || 12.2 || 11.6 || 23.8 || 2.4 || 4.3 || 10
|-style="background:#eaeaea;"
! scope="row" style="text-align:center" | 2016
|
| 2 || 22 || 10 || 11 || 288 || 329 || 617 || 56 || 118 || 0.5 || 0.5 || 13.1 || 15.0 || 28.0 || 2.5 || 5.4 || 11
|-
! scope="row" style="text-align:center" | 2017
|
| 2 || 16 || 10 || 6 || 207 || 232 || 439 || 63 || 86 || 0.6 || 0.4 || 12.9 || 14.5 || 27.4 || 3.9 || 5.4 || 7
|-style="background:#eaeaea;"
! scope="row" style="text-align:center" | 2018
|
| 2 || 25 || 15 || 10 || 285 || 329 || 614 || 66 || 93 || 0.6 || 0.4 || 11.4 || 13.2 || 24.6 || 2.6 || 3.7 || 7
|-
! scope="row" style="text-align:center" | 2019
|
| 2 || 22 || 8 || 5 || 241 || 210 || 451 || 83 || 53 || 0.4 || 0.2 || 11.0 || 9.5 || 20.5 || 3.8 || 2.4 || 0
|-style="background:#eaeaea;"
! scope="row" style="text-align:center" | 2020
|
| 2 || 8 || 1 || 3 || 50 || 54 || 104 || 23 || 13 || 0.1 || 0.4 || 6.3 || 6.8 || 13.0 || 2.9 || 1.6 || 0
|-
! scope="row" style="text-align:center" | 2021
|
| 2 || 8 || 2 || 3 || 50 || 45 || 95 || 23 || 12 || 0.3 || 0.4 || 6.3 || 5.6 || 11.9 || 2.9 || 1.5 || 0
|- class="sortbottom"
! colspan=3| Career
! 302
! 141
! 112
! 3366
! 3395
! 6761
! 899
! 1091
! 0.5
! 0.4
! 11.1
! 11.2
! 22.4
! 3.0
! 3.6
! 81
|}

Notes

Honours and achievements
Team
 McClelland Trophy: 2021

Individual
 Melbourne captain: 2014–2019
 Keith 'Bluey' Truscott Trophy: 2012, 2013, 2014
 AFL Rising Star nominee: 2006 (Round 20), 2007 (Round 17)
 David Neitz Medallist 2021

References

External links

1988 births
Living people
Australian rules footballers from Victoria (Australia)
Melbourne Football Club players
Dandenong Stingrays players
Keith 'Bluey' Truscott Trophy winners
Melbourne Football Club captains
Sandringham Football Club players